Daniela Ferrian (Asti, 12 September 1961) is an Italian former sprinter, three times silver medal with the Italian team of the 4x100 metres relay at the Mediterranean Games.

Biography
Her best result individual, at international level, was the 4th place at the 1987 European Athletics Indoor Championships, held in Liévin. She participated at the 1988 Summer Olympics. She won national championships at various distances 7 times. She has 51 caps in national team from 1982 to 1993.

Achievements

National titles
1 win on 200 metres at the Italian Athletics Championships (1986)
2 wins on 60 metres at the Italian Athletics Indoor Championships (1986, 1987)
4 wins on 200 metres at the Italian Athletics Indoor Championships (1985, 1987, 1991, 1993)

See also
 Italy national relay team - All the medals

References

External links
 
 Daniela Ferrian at The-Sports.org

1961 births
People from Asti
Italian female sprinters
Living people
Athletes (track and field) at the 1988 Summer Olympics
Olympic athletes of Italy
World Athletics Championships athletes for Italy
Mediterranean Games silver medalists for Italy
Mediterranean Games medalists in athletics
Athletes (track and field) at the 1983 Mediterranean Games
Athletes (track and field) at the 1987 Mediterranean Games
Athletes (track and field) at the 1991 Mediterranean Games
Italian masters athletes
Olympic female sprinters
Sportspeople from the Province of Asti